The 1972 UEFA European Football Championship final tournament was held in Belgium. This was the fourth UEFA European Championship, held every four years and endorsed by UEFA. The final tournament took place between 14 and 18 June 1972.

Only four countries played in the final tournament, with the tournament consisting of the semi-finals, a third place play-off, and the final.

The hosts were only announced after the qualifying round, which meant all teams had to participate in the qualification process for the final stage. Belgium was chosen among three candidates; the other bids came from England and Italy, whose teams did not reach the semi-finals.

West Germany won the tournament, beating the Soviet Union 3–0 in the final, with goals coming from Gerd Müller (twice) and Herbert Wimmer at the Heysel Stadium in Brussels.

Qualification

The qualifying round was played throughout 1970 and 1971 (group phase), and 1972 (quarter-finals). There were eight qualifying groups of four teams each. The matches were played in a home-and-away basis. Victories were worth two points, draws one point, and defeats no points. Only group winners could qualify for the quarter-finals. The quarter-finals were played in two legs on a home-and-away basis. The winners of the quarter-finals went through to the final tournament.

Qualified teams

Venues

Squads

Match officials

Final tournament

At the final tournament, extra time and a penalty shoot-out were used to decide the winner if necessary.

All times are local, CET (UTC+1)

Bracket

Semi-finals

Third-place play-off

Final

Statistics

Goalscorers

Awards
UEFA Team of the Tournament

References

External links

 UEFA Euro 1972 at UEFA.com

 
1972
1971–72 in European football
1971–72 in Belgian football
1972
June 1972 sports events in Europe